The Tower of Babel in the Old Testament was a tower built by a united humanity in an attempt to reach the heavens.

Tower of Babel may also refer to:

Artwork
 The Tower of Babel (Brueghel), painting by Pieter Brueghel the Elder
 The Tower of Babel (M. C. Escher), woodcut by Maurits Cornelis Escher

Games
Tower of Babel (board game), board game by Reiner Knizia
Tower of Babel (1986 video game), a video game by Namco for the Famicom and the Sharp X68000
Tower of Babel (1989 video game), computer game for the Amiga, Atari ST and Acorn Archimedes
 The Tower of Babel, a location in the RPG Final Fantasy IV, translated as the Tower of Babil
 The Tower of Babel, a temple to the god Marduk in Indiana Jones and the Infernal Machine
 The Tower of Babel, a location in the Super NES game Illusion of Gaia

Literature
 Babel Tower, an A. S. Byatt novel published in 1996
 JLA: Tower of Babel, a Justice League of America story arc
 "Tower of Babylon" (story), science fiction novelette by Ted Chiang
 Tower of Babel: The Evidence Against the New Creationism, book by Robert T. Pennock
 The Tower of Babel (novel), a 1968 novel by Morris West
 The Tower of Babble: Sins, Secrets and Successes inside the CBC, book by Richard Stursberg
 Star Trek: Enterprise – Rise of the Federation – Tower of Babel, a Star Trek: Enterprise novel by Christopher L. Bennett

Music
 "Tower of Babble" or "Tower of Babel", the prologue in the musical Godspell
 "Tower of Babel", a song from Elton John's 1975 album, Captain Fantastic and the Brown Dirt Cowboy

Television
 "Tower Of Babel" (Dilbert episode), episode of the TV cartoon show Dilbert

Other uses
 The Tower (Tarot card), which is sometimes called The Tower of Babel
 , an etymological project by linguist Georgiy Starostin

See also
 Babel (disambiguation)